Percival George Marunui Murphy (6 March 1924 – 3 May 2009) was a New Zealand mayor notable for being the first Māori to hold the title of mayor in New Zealand.

Alongside three of his brothers he served in the Second World War. He was in the 28th Māori Battalion.

Following the war he was a businessman and community leader; he was on the Murupara Borough Council and then served as mayor of Murupara for three terms 1960 to 1969.

Following his retirement from politics, he remained active in the affairs of his iwi Ngati Manawa and his marae Rangitahi. He died in Rotorua.

Sources 

Mayors of places in the Bay of Plenty Region
New Zealand military personnel of World War II
New Zealand Army personnel
People from the Bay of Plenty Region
1924 births
2009 deaths
Māori mayors
20th-century New Zealand politicians